Westpac Banking Corporation, known simply as Westpac, is an Australian multinational banking and financial services company headquartered at Westpac Place in Sydney, New South Wales.

Established in 1817 as the Bank of New South Wales, it acquired the Commercial Bank of Australia in 1981 before being renamed to Westpac Banking Corporation in 1982. Westpac is one of Australia's Big Four banks, and is Australia's first and oldest banking institution. Its name is a portmanteau of "Western" and "Pacific".

As of 2021, Westpac has 14 million customers worldwide, and employs around 40,000 people.

History
Established in Sydney in 1817, the Bank of New South Wales (BNSW) was the first bank in Australia. Edward Smith Hall was its first cashier and secretary. During the 19th and early 20th century, BNSW opened branches first throughout Australia and Oceania: at Moreton Bay (Brisbane) in 1850; in Victoria in 1851; in New Zealand in 1861; in South Australia in 1877; in Western Australia in 1883; in Fiji in 1901; in Papua New Guinea in 1910; and in Tasmania in 1910.

1927: BNSW acquires the Western Australian Bank.
1931: BNSW acquires the Australian Bank of Commerce
1968: BNSW joins the Databank Systems Limited consortium to provide joint data processing services.
1970: BNSW is listed on the Australian Securities Exchange on 18 July 1970.
1973: BNSW becomes the corporate sponsor of the Rescue Helicopter service started by Surf Life Saving Australia. The service is known today as the Westpac Life Saver Rescue Helicopter Service.
1974: The Bank of New Zealand (20%), BNSW (20%), Bank of Hawaii (20%), and the Government of Tonga (40%) establish the Bank of Tonga as a joint venture.
1975: BNSW incorporates its local business in Papua New Guinea as Bank of New South Wales (PNG).
1977: BNSW forms the Pacific Commercial Bank in Samoa as a joint venture with Bank of Hawaii, buying into Pacific Savings and Loan Company, in which Bank of Hawaii had had an ownership interest since 1971.

Westpac is formed
1982: BNSW merged with the Commercial Bank of Australia and changed their name to Westpac Banking Corporation, with the mission to become a significant Western Pacific bank from which Westpac is derived. The brandname incorporated the "W" which had been the logo of the Bank of New South Wales (popularly known as "the Wales").
1984: The original agreement between BNSW and the government in the Gilbert and Ellice Islands expired and WBC and the government of Kiribati formed the Bank of Kiribati as a 51–49% joint venture. Bank of Kiribati also fulfilled the functions of a reserve or central bank.
1985: WBC replaced Barclays in the National Bank of Tuvalu (est. 1981) in Tuvalu (ex-Ellice Islands), taking 40% of the shares as well as a 10-year management contract.
1988: the firm acquired the European Pacific Banking Corporation in the Cook Islands and a HSBC subsidiary, the Solomon Islands Banking Corporation, which HSBC had established as a branch in 1973. WBC also acquired HSBC's operations in Fiji and the New Hebrides, and established a branch in Niue that is the only bank in that country. (HSBC had established its branch in Fiji only some 18 months earlier).
1990: Bank of New Zealand sold half its shares in Bank of Tonga to WBC and half to Bank of Hawaii, giving each of them 30%. WBC bought Banque Indosuez's operations in New Caledonia and Tahiti. (Banque de l'Indochine, which later merged into Banque Indosuez, had established itself in New Caledonia in 1888 and in Papeete, Tahiti in 1905. In both places l'Indochine functioned as the bank of issue until 1966–7.)
1992: WBC recorded a 1.6 billion dollar loss, which at the time, was the largest loss for an Australian corporation. In the process the firm came close to insolvency, and slipped from being Australia's largest to third largest bank.
1995: WBC sold its shares in National Bank of Tuvalu to that country's government, which now wholly owns the bank.
1995: WBC acquired Challenge Bank.
1996: WBC Holdings NZ bought Trust Bank, a chain of regional banks owned by Community Trusts, for NZD1.2 billion to form NZ largest bank, WestpacTrust. The bank had promised to keep the funding to Community Trusts flowing and to keep "Trust" in its name. However, Community Trust funding slowed to a trickle, and in 2002 the bank launched a rebranding which included dropping the "Trust" from its name. The merger of WBC and Trustbank also saw the closure of many branches around New Zealand. In towns and cities where both WBC and Trustbank existed, the bank merged redundant branches into a single branch; also it closed many branches in rural areas and outer suburbs.
1996: WBC sold Challenge Bank's Victorian assets to the Bank of Melbourne.
1997: it acquired Bank of Melbourne in Victoria, paying an estimated price in excess of A$1.4 billion. WBC retained the rights to the Bank of Melbourne name and logos, but in 2004 rebadged the branches as Westpac. In 2011, Westpac relaunched the brand.
1998: it sold its operations in New Caledonia and Tahiti to Société Générale, which merged them with Société Générale Calédonienne de Banque (est. 1971) and Banque de Polynésie (est. 1973), respectively.
2001: The government of Kiribati sought to reduce Westpac's share in Bank of Kiribati from 51 to 49%, leading WBC to sell its shares back to the government. Bank of Hawaii sold its interest in Pacific Commercial Bank (42.7%) to Westpac, which held an equal portion. WBC offered Samoan investors, who held the remaining shares, the same price it had paid Bank of Hawaii. WBC now owns 93.5% of Westpac Bank Samoa and Samoan companies and individuals own 6.5%. In Tonga, Bank of Hawaii sold its shares in Bank of Tonga to Westpac, giving WBC 60% ownership of what is now Westpac Bank of Tonga.
2002: WBC acquired BT and Rothschild Australia Asset Management.
2004: The Reserve Bank of New Zealand required WBC to incorporate its NZ branches network. WBC sold its branch in Niue to Bank of South Pacific.
2008: Former St George Bank CEO Gail Kelly appointed chief executive officer and managing director.
2008: WBC announced that it intended to merge with the 5th largest Australian bank, St George Bank, for A$19 billion. The holders of about 95% of St George's shares voted in favor of the merger.
2008: On 17 November, the Federal Court of Australia approved the merger of Westpac and St George.
2011: During July, St George branches in the state of Victoria were rebadged as Bank of Melbourne branches.
In early February 2012, Westpac announced plans to axe more than 400 domestic jobs and another 150 offshore jobs. This action was a response to much slower growth over the past several years and the desire to rationalize following Westpac's 2008 merger with St. George Bank.
In 2014, Brian Hartzer was named CEO of Westpac.
2017: WBC celebrated its 200th anniversary.
2020: In April, Peter King was appointed CEO of Westpac, replacing Brian Hartzer.

Core business activities
The structure involves five key divisions including: Consumer Bank, Commercial and Business Bank, BT Financial Group, Westpac Institutional Bank and Westpac New Zealand. These five divisions serve more than 13 million customers.

Consumer Bank
Consumer Bank is responsible for sales and service of its 9 million consumer customers in Australia, assisting them with their everyday banking needs. The division covers all consumer banking products and services under the Westpac, St George, BankSA, Bank of Melbourne and RAMS brands.

Activities are conducted through the Consumer Bank's nationwide network of 877 branches, third-party distributors, call centres, 1,637 ATMs, EFTPOS terminals and internet banking services.

Business Bank
The Business Bank is responsible for sales and service of its small-to-medium enterprise, commercial and agribusiness customers in Australia, as well as asset and equipment finance and operates under the Westpac, St George Bank, BankSA and Bank of Melbourne brands.

Business and corporate customers (businesses with facilities typically up to $150 million) are provided with a wide range of banking and financial products and services, including specialist advice for cash flow finance, trade finance, automotive and equipment finance, property finance, transaction banking and treasury services. Sales and service activities for business and corporate customers are conducted by relationship managers via business banking centres, internet and customer service centre channels.

BT
BT is the wealth management brand of the Westpac Group.

Funds Management operations include the manufacture and distribution of investment, superannuation products and investment platforms including Panorama, BT Wrap and Asgard. Insurance solutions cover the manufacturing and distribution of life, general and lenders mortgage insurance.

Westpac Institutional Bank
Westpac Institutional Bank (WIB) delivers a broad range of financial services to commercial, corporate, institutional and government customers.

WIB operates through dedicated industry relationship and specialist product teams, with expert knowledge in transactional banking, financial and debt capital markets, specialized capital, margin lending, broking and alternative investment solutions.

Customers are supported through operations in Australia, New Zealand, the US, the UK, and Asian centers.

Westpac New Zealand

In 1861 the Bank of New South Wales opened seven branches in New Zealand. Currently, Westpac NZ offers a full-service with around 1.5 million customers, 3,000 shareholders and 197 branches nationwide. It is the dominant provider of banking services to small to medium business, corporate and institutional organizations, and is the banker of the New Zealand government. As of June 2022, it is the third largest bank in New Zealand, with a market share of 19%.

On 29 September 2006 the New Zealand Commerce Commission fined Westpac NZ$5.1 million for hidden foreign transaction fees, with most of the fine being reimbursement to affected customers, in the order of 12% of the fees actually charged. All other banks operating in New Zealand had either already been fined or were awaiting a court case.

In October 2009, Westpac NZ was required to pay NZ$961 million to the Inland Revenue Department (New Zealand) in avoided taxes.

On 22 July 2014, the firm announced that it would pilot a host card emulation (HCE) mobile payments technology to customers. It was the first bank in New Zealand to actively bring HCE mobile payments to market and one of only a handful of banks globally to be using the innovative 'digital wallet' technology. The three-month trial, using Carta Worldwide HCE technology, enabled customers to securely store and access credit and debit card information in a remote and hosted 'cloud' environment, enabling customers to use their Android smartphones as digital wallets. Soon after, in August 2014, Westpac NZ announced that it would be releasing the world's first augmented bank app, which adds layers of functionality to the digital wallet by enabling users to check account balances, view previous spending behaviors, pay bills and locate their nearest Westpac NZ branch or ATM. The app is also viewable in a 3D format by supported devices.

Naming rights
 Westpac Stadium in Wellington from 2000 to 2019
 Westpac Halberg Award

ATM Alliance
Westpac is a member of the Global ATM Alliance, a joint venture of several major international banks that allows customers of the banks to use their ATM card or check card at another bank within the Global ATM Alliance with no fees when traveling internationally. Other participating banks are Allied Irish Banks (Ireland), Barclays (in the UK, Spain and parts of Africa), Bank of America (US), BNP Paribas (France), Ukrsibbank (Ukraine), Deutsche Bank (in Germany, Spain, Italy, Poland), and Scotiabank (in Canada, Chile, Mexico among many other countries).

Westpac Migrant Banking
This unit of both the Australian and New Zealand Bank offers banking facilities to those migrating to either New Zealand or Australia. Bank accounts for migrants can be opened before people arrive in the country, and credit cards and mortgages can be approved before arrival.  Westpac Migrant Banking has a representative office in London where accounts can be arranged, although the process can be done remotely from any country. Westpac planned to open a retail branch in London in 2011.

Westpac Pacific

Westpac operates in seven south Pacific nations; the unit is headquartered in Sydney. The financial services offered include electronic banking (via online banking, ATMs and EFTPOS), deposit, loan, transaction accounts and international trade facilities to personal and business customers. Westpac Fiji is Westpac's Fijian operation. It is one of the largest banks in the country and has a 40% market share.

Westpac Outstanding Women Awards
Westpac recognizes numerous professional women each year who are doing exceptional work in several sectors of the Papua New Guinea economy with the Westpac Outstanding Women Awards.

Banking Alliance for Women
Westpac Pacific Banking is a member of the Global Banking Alliance for Women, supporting initiatives in the Pacific to help women prosper and grow.

Reinventure
Westpac has committed $150m to the venture capital group Reinventure with the objective to increase the impact of technology in financial markets. The Westpac-backed firm has invested in start-ups like BrickX, OpenAgent and CodeLingo. Reinventure is mandated to invest independently of Westpac, unlike venture capital strategies led by other Australian banks.

Controversies

Manipulation of benchmark interest rates
In April 2016, the Australian Securities and Investments Commission began legal proceedings against Westpac for manipulation of Australian benchmark interest rates, alleging that it had traded in a manner intended to create an artificial price for bank bills. It further alleged that Westpac was seeking to maximize profit or minimize its losses to the detriment of those holding opposite positions to Westpac. In November 2018, Westpac was fined the maximum penalty of AUD$3.3m and ordered to pay legal costs.

US Federal Reserve borrowings
In 2009, a Westpac-owned entity secured US$1.09 billion from the US Federal Reserve. Commentary suggests this was an unusual move for the bank, given its relatively minor position in North America. The borrowings by Westpac occurred at the height of the global financial crisis and were part of the Federal Reserve's move to stabilize financial markets globally. The public and government attention of the borrowings followed the release of the information by the Federal Reserve in 2010, not Westpac.

Funding of coal mining in New Zealand
Westpac came under criticism from 350.org for its role in funding mining company Bathurst Resources, which was permitted to mine coal on the Denniston Plateau, claiming that the mine would release up to 218 million tonnes of carbon dioxide.

Money laundering and child exploitation scandal
In November 2019, it was revealed that Westpac was alleged to have violated anti-money laundering, child exploitation and counter-terror finance laws. Westpac's CEO, Brian Hartzer, resigned in the wake of the scandal. According to Australian regulators, Westpac had 23 million anti-money laundering law violations, which is Australia's biggest ever anti-money laundering scandal to date.

On 24 September 2020, Westpac and AUSTRAC agreed to a AUD$1.3 billion penalty over Westpac's breaches of the Anti-Money Laundering and Counter-Terrorism Financing Act 2006. This is the largest fine ever issued in Australian corporate history.

Unsolicited sales campaign 
In August 2021, Westpac was fined $10.5m for breaches to best interests duty after it provided personal financial product advice in calls to 14 customers in a sales campaign. The sales campaign aimed at rolling customers from their existing superannuation into Westpac superannuation products.

String of misconduct cases 
In April 2021, the Australian Securities & Investments Commission launched six civil penalty proceedings against Westpac for alleged misconduct and widespread compliance failures. The six cases that were all settled by April 2022 are:

 Charged $10.9m in advice fees to 11,800 deceased customers for services that were not provided, fined $40m.
 Distributed duplicate insurance policies to 7,000 customers for the same property and issuing insurance policies to 329 customers who had not consented, fined $15m.
 Charged $10.6m in ongoing financial advice fees to at least 25,000 customers without disclosing these fees, fined $6m.
 Charged fees to 21,000 deregistered company accounts, holding $120m in funds instead of remitting to ASIC or the Commonwealth, fined $20m.
 Sold consumer credit card and flexi-loan debt to debt purchasers with incorrect interest rates, resulting in 16,000 customers being overcharged interest, fined $12m.
 Charged 9,900 members insurance premiums that included commission payments which are banned, fined $20m.

Westpac was fined $113m total for the string of misconduct cases.

Corporate responsibility
In 2002 Westpac released a social impact report that outlined the bank's plan to meet international standards in the area of corporate social responsibility. This led to Westpac's assessment as the global sustainability leader for the banking sector in the Dow Jones Sustainability Index from 2004 to 2007.

Westpac has been criticized for backing logging operations on the Solomon Islands that destroy virgin rainforests. Because of this, the Australian Greens have called for the Banksia Awards to be withdrawn from Westpac.

Executive leadership

Chief Executives
The following individuals have been appointed to serve as chief executive:

Chairs of the Board
The following individuals have been appointed to serve as chairman of the board:

See also

 Banking in Australia
Global ATM Alliance
List of banks in Australia
 List of banks in Oceania
Westpac House
Westpac Life Saver Rescue Helicopter Service
Westpac Rescue Helicopter (New Zealand)
Westpac Stadium
List of Westpac buildings

References

Further reading
Narube, S. and B.T. Whiteside. 1985. "Financial Institutions and Markets in Fiji". In M. T. Skully, ed. Financial Institutions and Markets in the Southwest Pacific. London: Macmillan Press.
Tschoegl, A.E. 2005. Foreign Banks in the Pacific: A Note. Journal of Pacific History.

External links 

 

 
Banks of Australia
Companies listed on the Australian Securities Exchange
Banks established in 1817
Financial services companies based in Sydney
Australian companies established in 1817